Edward Hanlan "Ned" Ten Eyck (August 7, 1879 – September 8, 1956) was an American champion rower and crew coach. He is best known for becoming the first American to win the Diamond Sculls championship at the Henley Royal Regatta in 1897.

Ten Eyck held the National Association of Amateur Oarsmen championship title in the single sculls in 1898, 1899, and 1901.  He followed his father, crew coach James A. Ten Eyck, as head coach at Syracuse University. Both were members of the Dutch American Ten Eyck family. He was also head coach at University of Wisconsin–Madison and Rutgers University.

Ten Eyck was a native of Peekskill, New York. He died on September 8, 1956, in Idaho Falls, Idaho, after an operator for cancer.

References

1879 births
1956 deaths
American male rowers
Rutgers Scarlet Knights rowing coaches
Syracuse Orange rowing coaches
Wisconsin Badgers rowing coaches
People from Peekskill, New York
Sportspeople from Westchester County, New York
American people of Dutch descent
Edward H.